Erodiini is a tribe of darkling beetles in the subfamily Pimeliinae of the family Tenebrionidae. There are more than 30 genera in Erodiini.

Genera
These genera belong to the tribe Erodiini

 Ammodoides Lesne, 1915  (tropical Africa)
 Ammozoides Kaszab, 1979  (the Palearctic)
 Ammozoum Semenov, 1891  (the Palearctic)
 Amnodeis Miller, 1858  (the Palearctic)
 Anodesis Solier, 1834  (tropical Africa)
 Apentanodes Reitter, 1914  (the Palearctic and Indomalaya)
 Arthrodeis Solier, 1834  (the Palearctic and tropical Africa)
 Arthrodibius Lesne, 1915  (the Palearctic and tropical Africa)
 Arthrodion Lesne, 1915  (tropical Africa)
 Arthrodosis Reitter, 1900  (the Palearctic)
 Arthrodygmus Reitter, 1914  (Indomalaya)
 Arthrohyalosis Kaszab, 1979  (the Palearctic)
 Arthrohyalus Koch, 1943  (the Palearctic)
 Bulbulus Lesne, 1915  (the Palearctic)
 Capricephalius Koch, 1943  (the Palearctic)
 Diaphanidus Reitter, 1900  (the Palearctic)
 Diodontes Solier, 1834  (tropical Africa)
 Erodinus Reitter, 1900
 Erodiontes Reitter, 1914  (the Palearctic)
 Erodius Fabricius, 1775  (the Palearctic)
 Farsarthrosis Kaszab, 1979  (the Palearctic)
 Foleya Peyerimhoff, 1916  (the Palearctic)
 Histeromimus Gahan, 1895  (the Palearctic)
 Histeromorphus Kraatz, 1865  (tropical Africa)
 Hyalarthrodosis Kaszab, 1979  (the Palearctic)
 Hyalerodius Kaszab, 1979  (the Palearctic)
 Iranerodius Kaszab, 1959  (the Palearctic)
 Leptonychoides Schawaller, 1990  (the Palearctic)
 Leptonychus Chevrolat, 1833  (the Palearctic)
 Piestognathoides Kaszab, 1981  (the Palearctic)
 Piestognathus P.H. Lucas, 1858  (the Palearctic)
 Somalammodes Koch, 1943  (tropical Africa)
 Spyrathus Kraatz, 1865  (the Palearctic and Indomalaya)

References

Further reading

 
 

Tenebrionoidea